Kwame Osei-Prempeh (born 19 December 1957) is a Ghanaian politician and a member of the Fifth Parliament of the Republic of Ghana representing the Nsuta-Kwamang Beposo in the Ashanti Region of Ghana.

Early life and education 
Prempeh was born in Kwamang in Ashanti Region of the Ghana. He attended the Kwame Nkrumah University of Science and Technology and obtained his Degree in Bachelor of Social Science in 1982. He attended the University of Ghana in 1987 and studied Quantum Chemistry Laboratory, QCL. He also attended Ghana school of Law and obtained a Degree in Bachelor of Law in 1989.

Career 
Prempeh was an Associate for Sarpong Legal Services in Ashanti Region -Kumasi.He was also a member of Parliament for the Nsuta-Kwamang Beposo constituency in the Ashanti Region of Ghana. He became the Acting Managing Director of and Group Chief Executive of GOIL Company Limited on June 3, 2019, after being a board member since two years prior.

Politics 
Prempeh is a member of the New Patriotic Party. He was first elected into Parliament during the December 1996 Ghanaian general election on the Ticket of the New Patriotic Party. He polled 12,586 votes out of the 24,444 valid votes cast representing 51.5% against Thomas Fokuo Agyepong an NDC member who polled 10,313 representing 33.70%. He won the 2000 Ghanaian General Elections with 13,568 votes out of the 21,358 valid votes cast representing 63.50% against Ebenezer A. Frimpong Prempeh and NDC member, Osei O. Emmanuel an NRP member, Osei Kwadwo a CPP member, Salisu Muhammed a PNC member and Kofi A. Kankam a UGM member who polled 6,889 votes, 304 votes, 285 votes, 221 votes, 91 votes respectively. He polled 15,704 votes out of the 24,344 valid votes cast representing 64.50% against Samuel Otu an NDC member, E.O.Adu-Amankwaah a IND member and George Osei Owusu Amankwah a CPP member who polled 7,769, 547 and 324 votes respectively. He polled 17,403 votes out of the 24,879 valid votes cast representing 69.95% during the 2008 General Elections. He was defeated by Kwame Asafu-Adjei during the 2012 General Elections.

Personal life 
Prempeh is married with four children. He is a Christian and a member of the Adventist Church.

References

1957 births
Living people
New Patriotic Party politicians
Kwame Nkrumah University of Science and Technology alumni
Ghanaian MPs 2001–2005
University of Ghana alumni
People from Ashanti Region
21st-century Ghanaian politicians
20th-century Ghanaian lawyers
Ghanaian MPs 1997–2001
Ghanaian MPs 2005–2009
Ghanaian MPs 2009–2013
Ghanaian Seventh-day Adventists